Potassium amide is an inorganic compound with the chemical formula . Like other alkali metal amides, it is a white solid that hydrolyzes readily. It is a strong base.

Production
Potassium amide is produced by the reaction of ammonia with potassium. The reaction typically requires a catalyst.

Structure
Traditionally  is viewed as a simple salt, but it has significant covalent character and is highly aggregated in ammonia solution. The compound has been characterized by X-ray crystallography as the solvent-free form as well as the mono- and diammonia solvates. In , the potassium centers are each bonded to two amido ligands and four ammonia ligands, all six of which bridge to adjacent potassium centers. The result is a chain of hexacoordinate potassium ions. The K– distances are 2.7652(11) whereas the K– distances are respectively 2.9234(11) and 3.0698(11) Å.

References

Potassium compounds
Metal amides